Vladimir Egorovich Kuzhelev (born 29 April 1974) is a former Russian football player.

Club career
In 1991, he made his debut for FC Dynamo Bryansk. Kuzhelev also played for FC Energia Uren, FC Lukoil Chelyabinsk and FC Amur Blagoveshchensk in Russia, FC Torpedo-Kadino Mogilev in Belarus, FC Volyn Lutsk and FC Prykarpattya Ivano-Frankivsk of Ukraine.

Honours
 Russian Second Division runner-up: 2003, 2004.

External links
 
 

1974 births
Living people
Russian footballers
Association football midfielders
FC Dynamo Bryansk players
FC Volyn Lutsk players
FC Torpedo Mogilev players
FC Spartak Ivano-Frankivsk players
Belarusian Premier League players
Ukrainian First League players
Russian expatriate footballers
Expatriate footballers in Belarus
Expatriate footballers in Ukraine
FC Spartak Nizhny Novgorod players
FC Amur Blagoveshchensk players
Sportspeople from Bryansk Oblast